Harouna Kaboré (born 24 July 1977) is a Burkinabé politician. He is currently the Minister of Commerce, Industry and Handicrafts.

Biography
Harouna Kaboré was born on 24 July 1977 in Assuéfry, Ivory Coast. Harouna Kaboré studied in Ivory Coast and Burkina Faso, then in France. He obtained a professional license in multi-technical maintenance engineering at the Paris XII University (present-day Paris-Est Créteil University) in 2006.

In 2010, he came back to Burkina Faso to "participate in the economic and social transformations of the motherland". He created his first two entreprises and another in Ivory Coast.

On 31 January 2018, Harouna Kaboré was appointed the Minister of Commerce, Industry and Handicrafts, replacing Stéphane Sanou. He took office on 5 February.

On 19 January 2019, he resigned together with other members of Thieba cabinet. On 25 January, he was reappointed as the Minister of Commerce, Industry and Handicrafts.

References

1977 births
Living people
People from Zanzan District
Trade ministers of Burkina Faso
Industry ministers of Burkina Faso
21st-century Burkinabé people